Timothy Roberts may refer to:

Timothy Roberts (conductor), English harpsichordist, musicologist and conductor
Timothy Roberts (cricketer) (1978), English cricketer who played for Lancashire and Northamptonshire